Bang Phlat is one of the 50 districts (khet) of Bangkok, Thailand. Its neighboring districts, clockwise from the north, are Bang Kruai district, Bang Sue, Dusit, Phra Nakhon, Bangkok Noi, and Taling Chan.

History
Bang Phlat was one of the 25 districts created in 1915, when the inner districts of Bangkok were reorganized. In 1938 the district was abolished and added to Bangkok Noi.

Bang Phlat district was again set up in 1989 by taking four sub-districts from Bangkok Noi. The west side of Borommaratchachonnani Road and Somdet Phra Pin Klao Road were moved back to Bangkok Noi in 1991, creating the new Arun Amarin Sub-district.

Bang Phlat has a number of transliteration spellings that are visible across the district including: Bang Phlat, Bang Phlad, Bang Plat, Bang Plad. It is likely that this spelling will become unified as the new MRT station stop has been titled "Bang Phlat".

The term Bang Phlat meaning 'lost place'. It is thought that, in the past, the area was filled with waterways and overgrown. People travelling from other areas lost their way.

Administration
The district is divided into four sub-districts (khwaeng).

Places
The main road running through Bang Phlat is Charan Sanit Wong, a road that parallels the Chao Phraya to the west from Thon Buri up to the Rama VII bridge.

Bang Phlat has a mixture of light commercial, industrial and residential zones. There are a few medium commercial and residential areas which are growing as the area becomes more prosperous. There are two Express River Boat stations servicing Bang Phlat, Krung Thon Bridge to the south and Rama VII Bridge to the north.
 Rama VIII Bridge and Rama VIII Park
 Krungthon Bridge
 Wat Kharuehabodi (วัดคฤหบดี)
 Wat Bowon Mongkhon (วัดบวรมงคล)
 Masjid Bang O 
Yanhee International Hospital
 Pata Pinklao and Pata Zoo

References

External links
 bangpladliving.com website offering google map with local information in English
 BMA website with the tourist landmarks of Bang Phlat
 Bangphlat District Office

 
Districts of Bangkok